Sylvi-Kyllikki Kilpi (née Sylvia-Kyllikki Brink, later Sinervo; 23 April 1899, Helsinki – 22 February 1987, Helsinki) was a Finnish journalist, literary critic and politician. She was a member of the Parliament of Finland, representing the Social Democratic Party of Finland (SDP) from 1934 to 1946 and the Finnish People's Democratic League (SKDL) from 1946 to 1958. She was a member of the peace opposition during the Continuation War. In September 1946 she resigned her membership in the SDP and joined the Socialist Unity Party (SYP), a member organisation of the SKDL. She was married to Eino Kilpi.

References

1899 births
1987 deaths
Politicians from Helsinki
People from Uusimaa Province (Grand Duchy of Finland)
Social Democratic Party of Finland politicians
Socialist Unity Party (Finland) politicians
Finnish People's Democratic League politicians
Members of the Parliament of Finland (1933–36)
Members of the Parliament of Finland (1936–39)
Members of the Parliament of Finland (1939–45)
Members of the Parliament of Finland (1945–48)
Members of the Parliament of Finland (1948–51)
Members of the Parliament of Finland (1951–54)
Members of the Parliament of Finland (1954–58)
People of the Finnish Civil War (Red side)
Finnish people of World War II
University of Helsinki alumni
Writers from Helsinki
20th-century Finnish women politicians
Women members of the Parliament of Finland